Dale R. Cathell (born July 30, 1937) is an American lawyer and jurist from Worcester County, Maryland. From 1998 to 2007 he was a judge on the Maryland Court of Appeals.

Early life
Dale Roberts Cathell was born on July 30, 1937, in Berlin, Maryland to Dale Parson Cathell and his wife. He attended Stephen Decatur High School.

He served in the United States Air Force from 1955 to 1959. He then attended the University of Maryland, College Park from 1962 to 1964. He earned a LL.B. from the Mt. Vernon School of Law (now part of the University of Baltimore) in 1967 and was admitted to the Maryland bar in the same year.

Career
Cathell served as a partner of Cathell & Ewell from 1970 to 1980. He served as an associate judge of the District Court of Maryland, District 2 in Worcester County from 1980 to 1981. He then served as an associate judge from 1981 to 1982 and then an administrative judge of the Worcester County Circuit Court, 1st Judicial Court from 1982 to 1989.

On January 20, 1998, he became a judge of the Maryland Court of Appeals. He retired on July 20, 2007, but sat on the bench until his replacement was appointed.

Personal life
Cathell married Charlotte Morgan Kerbin of Snow Hill, Maryland in 1974. Together, they had one daughter and two sons, Dale Jr. and Will.

Awards
 2004 – Access to Justice Award, Women's Law Center of Maryland

References

External links
Cathell's profile at the Maryland state archives

1937 births
Living people
People from Berlin, Maryland
Cathell, Dale R.
20th-century American judges
20th-century American lawyers
21st-century American judges
Judges of the Maryland Court of Appeals
Maryland lawyers
Maryland state court judges
United States Air Force airmen